Бешаи Палангон (Beshai Palangon) Reserve is in Tajikistan close to the Afghan border where the Vakhsh River and the Panj River join to form the Amu Darya. The reserve stretches over 40 km from the southwest to the northeast.

Description 
The 460 km2 reserve is described by the WWF as the most important nature reserve in Central Asia, because of its large size and ecological diversity. In addition it is very important for rare species of tugay, or riparian forest, ecosystems.

The highest elevations reach about 1,200 m above sea level. The climate is continental and dry, the different habitats of Tigrovaya Balka comprise semideserts, savanna-like grasslands with pistachio trees and tugay vegetation with poplars, Russian silverberry and high grasses.

Fauna 
The area was one of the last strongholds of the Caspian tiger, whose tracks were seen in the reserve for the last time in 1953. As of today, Tigrovaya Balka is still home to the original main prey of the tiger, the rare Bactrian deer. Other larger species of the reserve include striped hyenas, golden jackals, swamp cats, wild boars, goitered gazelles, porcupines, the introduced nutrias, gray wolves, red foxes and in hills also urials.

Birds

The reserve has been identified by BirdLife International as an Important Bird Area (IBA) because it supports significant numbers of the populations of various bird species, either as residents, or as overwintering, breeding or passage migrants. These include red-crested pochards, pygmy cormorants, saker falcons, common coots, common cranes, pale-backed pigeons, pallid scops-owls, Egyptian nightjars, white-winged woodpeckers, brown-necked ravens, great tits, desert larks, streaked scrub-warblers, Sykes's warblers, Asian desert warblers, saxaul sparrows and desert finches.

External links
Tigrovaya Balka auf whc.UNESCO.org
Offizielle Seite des Reservates (Tadschikisch)

References

Nature reserves in Tajikistan
Khatlon Region
Important Bird Areas of Tajikistan
1953 establishments in the Soviet Union